The Test of Friendship is a 1908 American silent short drama film directed by D. W. Griffith.

Cast
 Arthur V. Johnson as Edward Ross
 Florence Lawrence as Jennie Colman
 Harry Solter as The Butler / Foreman
 George Gebhardt as The Valet
 Linda Arvidson as Guest / Woman at Wigmakers
 Robert Harron as Man Leaving Factory
 Charles Inslee as Employer / Guest
 Marion Leonard as Guest / Woman at Wigmakers
 Jeanie MacPherson
 Violet Mersereau
 Gertrude Robinson as Guest
 Mack Sennett as Guest / Man in Fight

References

External links
 

1908 films
1908 drama films
1908 short films
Silent American drama films
American silent short films
American black-and-white films
Films directed by D. W. Griffith
1900s American films